The Honda VFR750F is a motorcycle manufactured by Japanese automobile manufacturer Honda from 1986 to 1997.

The model was initially displayed to the press after the 1985 Bol d'Or before it was officially introduced in 1986. The motorcycle is a variation of sport bike and sport touring. The motorcycle is powered by a  V4 engine that was developed from the VF700/750F models.

The motorcycle's design is an evolution and complete redesign of the VF700/750F models. This redesign included multiple new features, including greater power output (104 hp up from 83 hp), lighter weight (claimed down 20 kg), a lower center of gravity, a wider front tire, a slightly shorter wheelbase (15mm), six gear ratios instead of five and gear driven cams.

Engine

The Honda VFR750F uses a V4 engine that is primarily made of cast Aluminium alloy, with the crankcase breather being divided horizontally. The engine is a carburetor-based air/fuel induction, 16-valve, gear-driven DOHC, liquid-cooled, 90° V4. Slightly different crankcases with the lower casing being modified to allow for the gear position indicator in place of the neutral switch used in VFR750P and VFR750K models.

On all  VFR750 models, the gear drive for the cams is located between the cylinders. Lubrication is done via a wet sump with a chain-driven, dual-rotor oil pump; an oil (air) cooler was also fitted. The transmission was a 6-speed, with a constant-mesh, wet multi-plate clutch and chain drive to the rear wheel with the exception of the 5-speed VFR750P which had a spacer in place of one of the gears.

A 180° crankshaft was used in VFR750F instead of the 360° crankshaft used in the VF and VFR750R.

The gear-driven camshaft system removed any lingering concerns about cam-chain maintenance, which had dogged the VF-series of Honda V4 engines.

Chassis 

The 1986 VFR750F used what Honda calls a diamond type frame, this is because the engine is "set" in the frame like a precious stone is set in jewellery. This design of the frame is now referred to as a twin spar. The 1986 VFR750F frame uses the engine as a stressed member and has a cast aluminium headstock joined via  extrusions to the rear castings. The VFR750F was the first of the 750 class to have an aluminium twin spar frame, weighing  and being similar to the VFR, the GSX-R also had an aluminium frame but it was of a conventional twin cradle design.

Suspension

Second-generation models had non-adjustable  cartridge-style Showa front forks, coupled with a remotely adjustable (for pre-load) emulsion-type Showa shock absorber and the trademark single-sided swing arm. Honda soon upgraded the VFR750F's suspension to include pre-load adjustment on the forks, and damping adjustment on the shock. The bike's distinctive swing arm, derived from the Elf-designed race-bike Pro-Arm development work, has the advantage of allowing rear-wheel removal without the need to remove the drive chain or rear axle, and allows chain adjustment to be made very simply with no concerns of altering wheel alignment.

Third-generation VFR750Fs continued to use the same basic suspension components as the VFR750FN/P, though the single-sided swing arm was redesigned to reduce weight.

Models

The VFR750F model has three distinct generations, each with significant revisions having taken place upon the introduction of the VFR750FL in 1990 and the VFR750FR in 1994.  The VFR750F ceased production in 1997 with the introduction of the VFR800Fi, marketed in the US as the "Interceptor" and in the UK as the "VFR".

1986–1987 — VFR750FG/H (RC24) 

A new model based on a complete redesign of the VF750F, with a full fairing, alloy twin-spar frame, gear-driven camshafts, and 16 inch front and 18 inch rear wheels. The VFR750FG also had a cam sensor which was omitted from all later versions. US and Canada models had round gauges while all other models had square gauges.

1986–1987 — VFR700F / VFR700F2 (RC26) 

The "Tariff Buster" 700cc VFR700F was almost identical to the 750cc version, with minor changes to graphics (no 750 on the lower fairing), shorter stroke, different cams, and altered ignition timing. Otherwise the VFR700F2 was mechanically the same as the standard F, but had an upgraded rear shock and fork internals alongside square gauges.

1986–1987 — VFR750RK (RC24) 
Not to be confused with the VFR750R (RC30) the VFR750RK was the HRC race kitted version of the VFR750F. Designed for TT F1 and Endurance racing as well as AMA Superbike. The kit bumped the claimed power output from 105PS@10500 rpm to 125PS@12000 rpm due to engine changes including new titanium rods (steel for AMA), pistons (raising compression to 11:1) and cams with larger (optional titanium for the inlet) valves. A new ECU bumped the ignition advance by 5°. Depending on year either the original carbs were modified or a new set were offered as an option.

As well as the engine parts, the kit options included a new radiator and optional secondary radiator, modified bodywork, wider wheels, new suspension (forks, shock and linkage) and the option for bars (replacing the clip-ons).

1988–1989 — VFR750FJ/K (RC24)

Minor revision with fairing redesign from a two piece to three piece along with 2-position flip up screen, exhaust redesign, stronger fork legs (up to 41mm from 37mm) but retaining anti-dive on the left leg, a more reliable ignition system and 17 inch wheels front and rear. Larger engine valves for improved midrange along with larger carbs. Gear ratios remain the same but the gearbox shift mechanism was upgraded to the same as the VFR750R (RC30).

A clock and fuel gauge were added and the pillion footrest mounts were changed from being part of the rear subframe to bolt on cast aluminium assemblies. New larger frame castings reduced the amount of frame welding. New fairing side-panels allowed easier access to the engine, and the fairing cutaways for the rider's feet were much reduced in area. The change in wheel size allowed both a greater range of tyre options and a claimed improvement in handling. This model was not imported into the US.

1990–1993 — VFR750FL/M/N/P (RC36) 

Model year 1990 saw a major redesign in the RC36 version. The forks now featured cartridge dampers, wheels were widened to 5.5 inch for wider tires, and the frame newly constructed. A single sided swingarm allowed for a narrow tail that could accommodate saddle bags while still offering comfort for a passenger. Alas, it also increased the weight by 17 kg.

1994–1997 — VFR750FR/S/T/V (RC36-2)
While keeping the RC36 model number and basic technical layout Honda changed around 200 parts in 1994. Among them were different brakes and riding position, a rear shock absorber with adjustable rebound damping and the tank capacity increased from 5 to 5.5 gal (19 to 21 L). The new model weighed 6 kg less. It was the last of the VFR750F models before the introduction of the VFR800Fi with 781 cc and fuel injection in 1998. Front fairing and lamp were designed similar to the NR 750, as Honda pointed out in advertising.

Japanese market only versions
In the Japanese domestic market other VFR750F variants included:
VFR750P - A police-specification model with its own distinctive model number (RC35) was restricted to 77 ps (75 hp) due to the Japanese power restrictions in place at the time and fitted with a five-speed gearbox, modified main stand, gear indicator, uprated alternator, crash bars, higher handlebars, and modified speedometer. This bike was not offered for sale to the general public.
VFR750K - Not to be confused with the VFR750FK, this was a naked style training version of the VFR750F and there were two versions. The first was based on the VFR750FG and retained the RC24 model number. The second was given its own distinctive model number (RC37) with the engine from the restricted to 77 ps (75 hp) VFR750P (RC35). The oil cooler was removed and it was fitted with different foot rests & handlebars, crash bars, a modified main stand and gear indicator. This bike was offered for sale to the general public.

Specifications

Related models include the VFR400R (NC30), RVF400R (NC35), VF1000F/VF1000R (SC15/16/19/20), VFR750R (RC30), RVF750R (RC45), NR750 (RC40) and VFR800Fi (RC46).

Race history
Although this particular model was not designed as a race bike, it has been used in various races. In 1986, British racer Ron Haslam took a standard VFR750F to third place in a soaked Transatlantic Challenge race at Donington Park, UK.

A modified, 'special' VFR750F called the '6X', a 135 hp@13000RPM 188 mph full HRC prototype using, RVF cycle parts and containing titanium valves, magnesium cases and flat-slide carburettors, weighing  (dry), less than the factory RVF that was first ridden by Wayne Gardner at a Suzuka test against TT F1 machinery. Wayne broke his four-stroke lap record by 1.5 seconds. Six examples of the '6X' were built, 4 for the Domestic Championships and two for the American Championships.

The  VFR '6X' was raced at the Isle of Man TT by Geoff Johnson, coming in 2nd to Joey Dunlop in both the F1 and Senior TT.

In the US Fred Merkel and Wayne Rainey contested the 1986 AMA Camel Pro Championship, which at the time had both Superbike and F1 races but only one championship, with the best finish of the day counting. Merkel just rode in the Superbike while Rainey did the F1 as well. Merkel won two races and Rainey seven, but the championship was won by Merkel by two points.

For 1987 Merkel's bike was passed to Bubba Shobert who took 3rd place in 1987, being beaten by Wayne Rainey and Kevin Schwantz. The points he earned during the 1987 season gained him victory in the AMA Grand National. In 1988 Shobert won three of the seven races to win the AMA superbike championship.

The engine developed in the 6X became the basis for the factory racer, the VFR750R. A race kit was available for the 1986-87 VFR from HRC for US$4,000, this including a titanium exhaust and was known as the VFR750RK.

References

External links 
 1986 Honda VFR750 — Bubba Shobert's Factory Superbike, Motorcycle Hall of Fame

See also 

 List of Honda motorcycles
 Honda

Vfr750f
Sport touring motorcycles
Motorcycles introduced in 1986